Freddy Jensen (28 January 1926 – 9 April 1996) was a Danish gymnast. He competed at the 1948 Summer Olympics and the 1952 Summer Olympics.

References

1926 births
1996 deaths
Danish male artistic gymnasts
Olympic gymnasts of Denmark
Gymnasts at the 1948 Summer Olympics
Gymnasts at the 1952 Summer Olympics
People from Nuuk